The 1997–1998 Highland Football League was won by Huntly for the fifth year in a row, the greatest number of consecutive Highland League titles won by any club. Nairn County finished bottom.

Table

Highland Football League seasons
4